Alpha Phi Gamma National Sorority, Inc. (also known as APhiG and Alpha Phi Gamma) is an Asian-interest sorority founded on , at California State Polytechnic University, Pomona (Cal Poly Pomona).

History and purpose
The sorority strives to promote sisterhood, service, academic excellence, personal development, and Asian awareness. Although Alpha Phi Gamma is an Asian-interest sorority, its sisters believe strongly in the importance of diversity and accept women of all nationalities.

Alpha Phi Gamma is a member of the National APIDA Panhellenic Association (NAPA).

Philanthropy
Alpha Phi Gamma's official National Philanthropy is the "Fight Against Violence Towards Women".

In November 2009, Alpha Phi Gamma became a member of the National Coalition Against Domestic Violence.

Chapters
Alpha Phi Gamma names its campus groups "charters". The sorority currently has fifteen active charters, a provisional active charter, and has closed two associate charters, never installed, now inactive.

Active groups in bold, inactive groups in italics.

National Board members
2020-2021 National Executive Board

See also
List of social fraternities and sororities

References

External links
 

Asian-American culture in California
Student organizations established in 1994
Fraternities and sororities in the United States
Student societies in the United States
California State Polytechnic University, Pomona
Asian-American fraternities and sororities
1994 establishments in California